Taoyuan International Airport Skytrain is a people mover system that runs between the two passenger terminal buildings at the Taoyuan International Airport. The system consists of two parallel tracks, North and South, each providing bidirectional service.

The north track is served by a single car for passport controlled passengers only. The south track serves both passport controlled passengers and the general public, separated by platform dividers between the cars.

An extension is underway towards the future third terminal building, at which time the skytrain service will be limited to airport staff and passport-checked passengers only. The Taoyuan Airport MRT is to serve general public access between the terminals, the Airport Hotel, and the Taoyuan-Taipei area.

Frequency 
 Peak (06:00~22:00): 2-4 min
 Off-peak (22:00~00:00): 4-8 min
 Night service: On demand

Technical details 
 Acceleration: 
 Deceleration:
 Service: 
 Emergency: 
 Capacity: 69 passengers (8 seated, 61 standing)
 Vehicle length: 
 Vehicle width: 
 Vehicle height: 
 Interior height:

References 
 Taoyuan International Airport Skytrain

External links 
 Taoyuan International Airport Official Website

Airport people mover systems
People mover systems in Taiwan
Taoyuan International Airport